Straylight Run is an emo band based in Baldwin, Nassau County, New York. The band released two albums, Straylight Run and The Needles the Space, as well as three EPs, Prepare to Be Wrong, About Time, and Un Mas Dos. In 2010, the band announced that they would be going on indefinite hiatus, but might reunite in the future. Two of the members, John Nolan and Shaun Cooper, previously played in Taking Back Sunday and have since rejoined the band.

History 
When he was still a member of Taking Back Sunday, John Nolan wrote several songs that he didn't feel would go well with the band. After their departure, John and Shaun Cooper recorded several demos with Taking Back Sunday drummer Mark O'Connell. The band began to take its present form when drummer Will Noon was invited to join after his former band, Breaking Pangaea, broke up. Breaking Pangaea's former lead singer was Fred Mascherino, who later took Nolan's place in Taking Back Sunday. Shortly thereafter, John's sister, Michelle DaRosa, joined Straylight Run. The band's name was taken from the final section of William Gibson's cyberpunk science-fiction novel Neuromancer.

The band gained popularity after posting six demo songs for free download on their official site. The group embarked on a brief headlining tour in the Northeast in September 2003 with support from Christiansen and JamisonParker. In October, the band went on their first full US tour, co-headlining the trek with the New Amsterdams. Following this, the band toured with the Format in November, and supported Coheed and Cambria in December. The band spent most of the month working on new material and making plans to record their debut. In January 2004, the band supported Brand New on their tour of the UK.

Straylight Run (2004)
Due to John's and Shaun's involvement in their previous band, they were bound by contract to release an album under Victory Records. They began to record their first album in April 2004 and released their self-titled debut album Straylight Run on October 12, 2004 after a one-month postponement. The album sold over 11,000 copies in the first week, and made the Billboard Top 100 Albums list.  The album featured Nate Ruess, former lead singer of The Format and current frontman of the indie-pop group fun. on the song "It's For the Best".  In late 2005, the band toured with Simple Plan.

Prepare to Be Wrong EP (2005)
On October 4, 2005 the band released their second record in the form of the Prepare to Be Wrong EP. The CD comprised two old demos ("A Slow Descent" from the band's original demo, and "It Never Gets Easier" a demo from the sessions for their first CD Straylight Run, although it was then known as "Costello"), a cover of Bob Dylan's "With God on Our Side" and 3 new songs. The CD ended their contract with Victory Records. Plans for a live DVD were in the works but were shelved.

The Needles the Space (2007)
On June 19, 2007 the band released their second album, The Needles the Space, under Universal Records.

On December 8, 2007 the band was dropped from Universal Records.

The band toured in support of Bayside in February and early March, 2008. The band toured in support of The Used on the inaugural Get a Life Tour from March 31 through May 11, 2008.

On June 3, 2008 Michelle DaRosa announced that she would be leaving Straylight Run to pursue a solo career. In her MySpace message, she left the door open to rejoining the band at some future time. In late 2008, DaRosa formed the band Destry which also featured Sam Means of the indie rock group The Format, as well as Shaun Cooper from Straylight Run.

Un Mas Dos EP and indefinite hiatus (2008-present)
On June 10, 2008 the band entered the studio for pre-production on their next CD, an EP entitled Un Mas Dos.  The band made the three song EP available in streaming format through MySpace and other means, and began selling digital download cards at its tour beginning September 9, 2008. On September 16, 2008 the band released the album in digital and vinyl format.

The band went on two tours in late 2008. In January 2009, the band's cover of the Nirvana track "Drain You" was made available for download. The group played at the Soundwave Festivals in Australia in February and March 2009, as well as two shows with Minus the Bear. The band then planned to do further recording, towards another EP. In May and June, the band went on tour with Lovedrug and Good Old War. Ahead of the release of About Time, "Don't Count Me Out" and "I'm Through with the Past" were posted on Myspace.

In February 2010, Straylight Run announced they were going on an indefinite hiatus due to financial complications. John Nolan stated that he would continue his solo act, and was not against the idea of returning to Straylight Run. Shaun Cooper wrote a blog saying that he was retiring from touring, thanking Straylight Run and also thanking Taking Back Sunday and saying he is really proud of the work and success they have accomplished. On March 31, 2010 it was confirmed that John Nolan and Shaun Cooper had returned to Taking Back Sunday.

On June 4, 2011, Nolan and Cooper teamed up with Taking Back Sunday drummer Mark O'Connell to play a show at Rogue Live Studios in Hicksville, NY, with their set featuring six Straylight Run songs. Nolan pointed out before the last song of the set, "Existentialism on Prom Night," that O'Connell was a member of Straylight Run for a brief time at its inception, before choosing to remain with Taking Back Sunday.

Will Noon frequently toured and performed as drummer for the band fun before their hiatus in 2015. He performed with them at the 2013 Grammy Awards Ceremony as well as their performance on Saturday Night Live

On December 8, 2021 the band performed their first live show since 2009, at Mulcahy's in Wantagh, New York.

Band members

John Nolan – vocals, guitar, piano (2003–10, 2021)
Michelle DaRosa – vocals, guitar, piano (2003–08, 2021)
Shaun Cooper – bass guitar (2003–10, 2021)
Will Noon – drums, percussion (2003–10, 2021)

Former members
Mark O'Connell – drums, percussion (2003)

Timeline

Discography

Albums

Straylight Run (2004)
The Needles the Space (2007)

EPs
Prepare to Be Wrong (October 4, 2005)
3 Track EP (2007)
Un Mas Dos (September 16, 2008)
About Time (May 20, 2009)

Demos
Demo (2003)
 "It’s Everybody’s Fault But Mine"
 "Existentialism on Prom Night"
 "A Slow Descent"
 "It’s For The Best"
 "Mistakes We Knew We Were Making"
 "The Tension and the Terror"

Singles
 2004 "Existentialism on Prom Night"
 2005 "Hands in the Sky (Big Shot)"
 2007 "Soon We'll Be Living in the Future"
 2007 "Still Alone"

Videography
 2004- "Existentialism on Prom Night"
 2005- "Hands in the Sky (Big Shot)"
 2007- "Buttoned Down" (video only; no single; included on enhanced CD of The Needles the Space)
           - "Soon We'll Be Living in the Future"
           - "How Do I Fix My Head" (video only; no single; included on enhanced CD of The Needles the Space)
           - "The Miracle That Never Came" (video only; no single; released on YouTube)
 2009- "Wait and Watch" (video only; no single; released on YouTube)
The track "Hands In The Sky" was featured in the Sons of Anarchy season two episode "The Culling".
The track "Existentialism on Prom Night" was featured in season one of the show Against the Wall.

References

External links 
 
Victory Records artist page

Alternative rock groups from New York (state)
Indie rock musical groups from New York (state)
Musical groups from Long Island
Musical groups established in 2003
Victory Records artists
American emo musical groups